The Siege is a Palestinian play developed and devised by The Freedom Theatre. It recounts the story of the 2002 Siege of the Church of the Nativity in Bethlehem.

UK tour
In May 2015, The Freedom Theatre embarked on its first tour of the UK. The Siege was the largest touring production performed in Britain by a Palestinian theatre company.

The UK tour was organized by The Freedom Theatre UK Friends, a network of over 300 people in Britain who are engaged in the theatre’s activities. The Siege and its UK tour are supported by the EU, the British Council, Steps Beyond – European Cultural Foundation, Arts Council England and The Roddick Foundation. Other supporters include the playwright, Howard Brenton and film-maker, Ken Loach.

Funding by Arts Council England angered local Jewish community. Actress Maureen Lipman joined pro-Israel groups including Zionist Federation in a protest outside the London premiere of The Siege at Battersea Arts Centre.

See also
 Seven Jewish Children
My Name Is Rachel Corrie

References

External links
The Freedom Theatre - the siege

Second Intifada
Palestinian arts